James Kelly MRIA (born 1959) is a professor of Irish history, specialising in the period 1700–1850, and is a prolific author, who also edits several learned journals.

Kelly was a professor at St Patrick's College, Drumcondra, Dublin, and is now a professor at Dublin City University, into which the college merged. He also edits for the Irish Manuscripts Commission and for the Proceedings of the Royal Irish Academy.

Bibliography

as author, co-author or principal editor:
 Henry Flood  Patriots and politics in eighteenth-century Ireland; Four Courts Press, Dublin, 1998.
 History of the Catholic Diocese of Dublin; ed. with Dáire Keogh; Four Courts Press, 2000.
 Gallows speeches from eighteenth-century Ireland; Four Courts, 2001.
 Childhood and its discontents : the first Seamus Heaney lectures; ed. Joseph Dunne and James Kelly ; foreword by Seamus Heaney. Liffey Press, 2003.
 The Irish Act of Union, 1800 : bicentennial essays; with Brown, Michael & Geoghegan, Patrick M.; Irish Academic Press, 2003.
 Sir Edward Newenham, MP, 1734–1814 Defender of the Protestant constitution; Four Courts Press, 2003.
  The Liberty and Ormond Boys : factional riots in eighteenth-century Dublin; Four Courts, 2005.
 St Patrick's College, Drumcondra, 1875–2000 A history; Four Courts, 2006. (as editor)
 Poynings' Law and the Making of Law in Ireland 1660–1800 : Monitoring the Constitution; Four Courts Press in association with the Irish Legal History Society, 2007.
 The Irish House of Lords; 1771–1800 in 3 vols., Irish Manuscripts Commission 2008.
 Sir Richard Musgrave, 1746–1818  Ultra-protestant ideologue; Four Courts, 2009.
 People, Politics and Power – Irish History from 1660–1850; as co-editor, University College Dublin Press, 2009.
 Clubs and societies in eighteenth-century Ireland; ed. with Martyn J. Powell; Four Courts, 2010.
 Sport in Ireland,1600-1840; Four Courts, 2014.
 Food Rioting in Ireland in the Eighteenth and Nineteenth Centuries; Four Courts, 2017.

See also
List of Irish learned societies
Ireland 1691–1801
Ireland 1801–1923

Notes

1959 births
Living people
Academics of Dublin City University
20th-century Irish historians
21st-century Irish historians
Irish non-fiction writers
Irish male non-fiction writers